Chatramthokkalikadu is a village in the Pattukkottai taluk of Thanjavur district, Tamil Nadu, India.

Demographics 

At the 2001 census, Chatramthokkalikadu had a total population of 900 with 438 males and 462 females. The sex ratio was 1055. The literacy rate was 65.01%.

References 

 

Villages in Thanjavur district